In the construction of masonry buildings, a fire cut or fireman's cut is a diagonal chamfer of the end of a joist or beam where it enters a masonry wall.  If the joist burns through somewhere along its length, damage to the wall is prevented as the fire cut allows the joist to fail and still leave the masonry wall standing.

Without firecut joists, if the burnt joists fail and rotate the unchamferred ends of the joists as they deflect downwards, this would damage the masonry wall at the connection point and possibly pull the wall inwards.

References

Masonry
Carpentry